WWQB (102.3 FM) is a radio station licensed to serve the community of Westwood, Kentucky. The station is owned by Serge Martin Enterprises, Inc., and airs a classic hits format, as a simulcast of sister station WMXE.

The station was assigned the WWQB call letters by the Federal Communications Commission on March 28, 2011.

References

External links
Official Website
FCC Public Inspection File for WWQB

WQB
Radio stations established in 2011
2011 establishments in Kentucky
Classic hits radio stations in the United States
Boyd County, Kentucky